The Pirate Party (PPNL) is a political party in the Netherlands, formed in 2006 but not officially registered until 10 March 2010. The party is based on the model of the Swedish Pirate Party.

Positions
The party purposefully limits itself to a limited number of positions. It wants to curb Dutch copyright law (where it wants non-commercial use to be free), to remodel patent law, to protect and strengthen (digital) civil rights, a transparent government and a considerate handling of IT-projects by the government. Its Declaration of Principles says that its purpose is "to change global legislation to facilitate the emerging information society, which is characterized by diversity and openness. We do this by requiring an increased level of respect for the citizens and their right to privacy, as well as reforms to copyright and patent law."

Electoral performance

General elections 
The party participated at the 2010 Dutch general election. The party gained no seats in the House of Representatives, becoming the third highest-ranking party not to gain any seats in the election—with over 10,000 votes (0.1% of the national vote).

On 12 July 2012, the candidate list for the  2012 general election was announced. The party leader, Dirk Poot, who two years earlier was 4th place on the list is first on the list, with former leader, Samir Allioui, coming last on the list. The party achieved 0.3%, over 30,000 votes, almost tripling their vote from the last election but failing to meet their target of entering parliament. They also became the largest party not to be represented in parliament.

The party took part in the 2017 general election on 15 March. The party leader was Ancilla van de Leest. The party got 0.34% of the votes (35,478 votes), but since 0.67% of the votes is required to gain a seat, the party did not enter the Dutch national parliament.

European Parliament elections 
The Pirate Party has participated in two European elections: in 2014 and in 2019. In 2019 the Pirate Party formed a common list with the From the Region Party.

Provincial elections

Municipal elections 
The party participated at the 2022 Dutch municipal elections. In the municipality of Enkhuizen, the party garnered 380 votes (5.03%), which earned the party a single seat (out of 17) in the Enkhuizen municipal council. Nationwide, the party gained 3251 votes (0.05%), with the aforementioned seat being the only one earned (out of 8237).

International

The party is member of Pirate Parties International (PPI). International cooperation through the PPI is seen as crucial to realising the goals of the party. The positions of the party are based on the Pirate Party Declaration of Principles.

Samir Allioui, co-founder of PPNL and party leader during the 2010 elections, was Co-President of Pirate Parties International (PPI) from July 2009 until April 2010.

See also
:Category:Pirate Party (Netherlands) politicians

References

External links 
 Official website

Netherlands
 
Political parties established in 2010
2010 establishments in the Netherlands